Cryptotympanini is a tribe of cicadas in the family Cicadidae. They are found in the Nearctic, Palearctic, Indomalaya, Oceania, and Afrotropics.

Genera
subtribe Cryptotympanina Handlirsch, 1925

 Anapsaltoda Ashton, 1921
 Antankaria Distant, 1904
 Arenopsaltria Ashton, 1921
 Auritibicen Lee, 2015
 Cacama Distant, 1904 (cactus dodgers)
 Chremistica Stål, 1870
 Cornuplura Davis, 1944
 Cryptotympana Stål, 1861
 Hadoa Moulds, 2015 (western annual cicadas)
 Hea Distant, 1906
 Henicopsaltria Stål, 1866
 Illyria Moulds, 1985
 Lyristes Horváth, 1926 (including Tibicen)
 Megatibicen Sanborn & Heath, 2016
 Mouldspsaltria Sanborn, 2021
 Neopsaltoda Distant, 1910
 Neotibicen Hill & Moulds, 2015 (annual or dogday cicadas)
 Orialella Metcalf, 1952
 Orientafroinsularis Sanborn, 2021
 Psaltoda Stal, 1861
 Raiateana Boulard, 1979
 Salvazana Distant, 1913 - monotypic S. mirabilis
 Tacua Amyot & Audinet-Serville, 1843

subtribe Heteropsaltriina Distant, 1905
 Heteropsaltria Jacobi, 1902
subtribe Nggelianina Boulard, 1979
 Nggeliana Boulard, 1979

Fossil genera
 † Camuracicada Moulds, 2018

Note

References

External links
 Cryptotympanini Handlirsch, 1925 - Catalogue of Life (Version: 2021-09-21)
 Tribe Cryptotympanini Handlirsch, 1925 - 3I Interactive Keys and Taxonomic Databases

 
Cicadinae
Hemiptera tribes